The Ram pickup (marketed as the Dodge Ram until 2010) is a full-size pickup truck manufactured by Stellantis North America (formerly Chrysler Group LLC and FCA US LLC) and marketed from 2010 onwards under the Ram Trucks brand. The current fifth-generation Ram debuted at the 2018 North American International Auto Show in Detroit, Michigan, in January of that year.

Previously, Ram was part of the Dodge line of light trucks. The name Ram was first used in 1981 model year Dodge Trucks in October 1980, following the retiring and rebadging of the Dodge D series pickup trucks as well as B-series vans, though the company had used a ram's-head hood ornament on some trucks as early as 1933.

Ram trucks have been named Motor Trend magazine's Truck of the Year eight times; the second-generation Ram won the award in 1994, the third-generation Ram heavy-duty won the award in 2003, the fourth-generation Ram Heavy Duty won in 2010 and the fourth-generation Ram 1500 won in 2013 and 2014, and the current fifth-generation Ram pickup became the first truck in history to win the award three times, winning in 2019, 2020, and 2021.

First generation (1981; D/W)

The first-generation Dodge Ram trucks and vans introduced in October 1980 feature a Ram hood ornament first used on Dodge vehicles from 1932 until 1954. Not all of the first-generation trucks have this ornament and is most commonly seen on four-wheel-drive models. Dodge kept the previous generation's model designations: D or Ram indicate two-wheel drive while W or Power Ram indicate four-wheel drive. Just like Ford, Dodge used 150 to indicate a half-ton truck, 250 for a three-quarter-ton truck, and 350 for a one-ton truck. The truck models were offered in standard cab, "club" extended cab, and crew cab configurations. Externally, the first-generation Rams were facelifted versions of the previous generation Dodge D-Series pickups introduced in 1972. The new model introduced larger wraparound tail lamps, dual rectangular headlamps, and squared-off body lines. Engine choices were pared down to the 225 slant-6 and 318 and 360 V8s. The interior was updated and included a new bench seat and a completely new dashboard and an instrument cluster with an optional three-pod design - a speedometer in the center, with the two side pods containing an ammeter on the top left, a temperature gauge on the bottom left, a fuel gauge on the top right and an oil pressure gauge bottom right. Models without the full gauge package had only indicator lights in the place of the temperature and oil pressure gauges. Among the options offered on the Ram were front bumper guards, a sliding rear cab window, air-conditioning, cruise control, tilt steering column, power door locks and windows, AM/FM stereo with a cassette tape player, styled road wheels, aluminum turbine-style mag wheels, special paint and stripe packages, two-tone paint, and a plow package for four-wheel-drive models (referred to as the "Sno Commander").

The "Club Cab" was dropped from the lineup after 1982, but Dodge kept the tooling and reintroduced it nearly a decade later in the 1990 models. The four-door crew cab and Utiline beds were dropped after the 1985 model year, to make room on the assembly line for the upcoming 1987 Dodge Dakota, and were never reintroduced in this generation.

Basic Ram 100 models were reintroduced for 1984, replacing the previous "Miser" trim level available on the Ram 150. A "Ram-Trac" shift-on-the-fly transfer case was added for the 1985 Power Rams, and both the crew cab and Utiline flared bed versions were discontinued for 1986, the latter not to return on any Chrysler-built pickup. In 1988 the slant-6 engine was replaced by a  fuel-injected V6 engine. The  engine also received electronic fuel injection in 1988. Because of the new computer-controlled fuel injection, ignition, and ABS system, more vehicle information needed to be displayed through any warning or notification lights; so inside the cab where a small compartment was once located on the dash, a new "message center" with four small rectangular light spots, contained the check engine light and other tell-tales including one for the parking brake and the ABS if the truck was so equipped. The message center later included "wait to start" and "water in fuel" lights on diesel models. Diagnostic fault codes were stored in the computer's memory, and cycling the ignition key three times allowed the computer to flash the trouble codes through the check-engine light for diagnosis of some problems. Rear ABS became standard equipment in 1989.

The Ram 100 model designation was dropped and these models folded back into the 150 range for 1990, due to the introduction and sales success of the Dodge Dakota pickup. Additionally, the instrument cluster was slightly revised; the ammeter was replaced by a voltmeter while maintaining the 3-pod arrangement of the speedometer and gauges. Also in 1990, Dodge reintroduced the Club Cab, equipped with fold-out jump seats for the 1991-1993 models. Entry was made through the passenger or driver's doors because there were no rear doors for this configuration. For 1991 the Club Cab returned, and all versions received standard anti-lock brakes on the rear wheels only.

These trucks, though popular with fleets, sold poorly compared to the Ford F-Series and the General Motors C/K trucks, with just under 100,000 units sold most years of their production. Part of this was due to the dated cab and chassis design which had been in production since 1972, there was no powerful diesel option until 1989, and there was no big-block gas V8 option. Additionally, the interior had been given few updates since the October 1980 market launch.

Engines and transmissions
For 1989, the 5.9 L V8 received throttle-body fuel injection for a 20 hp (15 kW) gain. Additionally, Dodge introduced a new overdrive automatic transmission for reduced fuel consumption. This light-duty transmission was designated the A500, and was offered with the 3.9 L V6 and 5.2 L V8. An "O/D off" pushbutton switch to lock out the overdrive 4th gear was added to the message center. The A727 automatic saw continued use for some 5.2 L engines, all 5.9 L engines, and heavy-duty applications.

The grille was redesigned for 1991 but kept the large rectangular headlamps and crossbar appearance. The engines were substantially upgraded for 1992 (3.9 L and 5.2 L) 1993 and 1994 (5.9 L) with multi-port fuel injection, new manifolds, and higher-compression cylinder heads for noticeably higher output. These newly revised engines were marketed under the "Magnum" name. A heavy-duty automatic transmission with overdrive called the A518 was offered with the 5.2 L and 5.9 L engines. As part of Chrysler's overhaul of corporate transmission nomenclature, the A500 and A518 were redesignated 42RH and 46RH, respectively, in 1992. The initial 4 signified a 4-speed transmission, the second digit identified the transmission's relative torque capacity, the letter R in the third position denoted a rear-wheel-drive transmission, and the final letter H signified hydraulic shift control. The 3-speed automatic remained available; the A727 was redesignated 36RH, and the A904, A998, and A999 became the 30RH, 31RH, and 32RH, respectively.

5.9 Cummins

A Cummins B Series engine was also added to the engine lineup in 1989. For the first time, Dodge saw sales increase. The Cummins was coupled with a heavier-duty version of the A727 automatic or a 5-speed manual transmission and was available on 250 and 350 pickups and pickup-based chassis-cab trucks. This diesel engine option was different from the optional types of diesel engines in Ford and GM trucks. The Cummins features direct injection, whereas the Ford and GM diesels feature indirect injection; this also means that the Cummins does not have to rely on glowplugs. The Cummins is a straight-six engine, whereas the GM and Ford diesel engines are V8 engines. Additionally, the Cummins is turbocharged, while the 6.2 L GM/DDC and 7.3 IDI Ford/IH are naturally aspirated.

This was not the first engine to appear in Dodge pickup trucks as a diesel option. The 1978 and 1979 D-Series models were available with a Mitsubishi naturally-aspirated diesel, but it was seldom ordered. The Cummins diesel was in short supply the first two years, but for 1991 Dodge managed to ramp up production.

Partway through the 1991 model year, Dodge started using 350 (one-ton) frames in Ram 250 Cummins and Club Cab models.

Engines

Gallery

Special editions
Prospector - Prospector was a package available throughout the 1980s that usually included a different fuel tank, cloth seat, and carpeting. In the late 1980s, a light package, as well as the large 6x9 mirrors, were added to the list of options. This trim package was carried on until the 1994MY redesign in 1993.

Second generation (1994; BR/BE)

The second-generation Dodge Ram began development in 1986. The original concept, dubbed the "Louisville Slugger" by Chrysler's Advanced Packaging Studio, was to be a modular platform that would accommodate a full-size truck and full-size van, which would have provided a roomy cab and cargo bed. The modular design was scrapped in 1987 and was replaced with a more conventional truck design when the design was moved to the American Motors design studio. The more conventional design, dubbed "Phoenix", was originally scheduled for a 1991 production; when Bob Lutz showed it to the new styling designers, chief designer Phillip E. Payne told him, "It looks like nothing more than a rehash of everybody else's truck." At that, Lutz told him he had six months to come up with something better. The exterior styling of the truck that was eventually released was the result of design concepts by Payne during 1988–1990. A review by the Dodge pick-up truck studio designers felt that modern pick-ups looked "too flat and sedan-like", while the early 1950s Studebaker pick-up and the semi-trailer trucks had just the right "macho" look to them. The design featured a big-rig-looking front end and a large grille that was deemed risky at its introduction, but ultimately proved popular with consumers.

Debuted on January 5, 1993, at the North American International Auto Show and going on sale on October 1, 1993, the redesigned 1994 Ram was a sales success and was named "Truck of the Year" by Motor Trend in 1994. Sales increased from 95,542 units in 1993 to 232,092 in 1994, 410,000 in 1995, and 411,000 by 1996. That year, it was prominently featured as the hero vehicle in the film Twister. Sales of this generation peaked at just over 400,000 in 1999 before declining against the redesigned Ford and GM trucks. By 2001, Ram sales figures were below those of Ford and Chevy trucks.

Engine offerings continued over from the first-generation Ram and were the 3.9 L V6, 5.2 L V8, 5.9 L V8, and 5.9 L I6 Cummins turbo diesel. Added to the lineup was a new 8.0 L V10 engine designed as an alternative for those who wanted superior pulling power but did not want a diesel. The new V10 and Cummins turbodiesel could only be had in the 2500 and higher designation models. Models were now the 1500 half-ton, 2500 three-quarter-ton, and 3500 dual-rear-wheel one-ton in both 2- and 4-wheel drive. Ram 1500s offered both short  and long  cargo beds on both regular and extended Club Cabs, Ram 2500s offered only long bed with regular cabs or a choice of beds on extended cabs, and Ram 3500s only offered long beds on both cabs.

Dodge offered the 2500 series in two different gross-vehicle-weight ratings for the first few years, but this was later dropped. The purpose of the difference between the light-duty and heavy-duty 2500 trucks was for the heavy-duty 2500 to take the place of the discontinued one-ton single-rear-wheel trucks. Rear axles for the light-duty 2500 trucks were semi-floating, while the heavy-duty 2500 rear axles were full-floating. Light-duty 2500 trucks were not available with the diesel or V10 engines.

On the inside, special attention was paid to in-cab storage features, with a large glovebox, a center armrest storage area, and extra storage space behind the seat.

1998 updates
In 1998, Dodge introduced the 4-door Quad Cab, which used smaller clamshell doors directly behind the main doors. This was the first extended cab pickup to have four doors. (The 2-door Club Cab remained available through 2002.) Other changes for 1998 included new rounded black plastic sideview mirrors, new plastic fold-out towing mirrors, a revised interior, dual airbags, a chime replacing the buzzer for seat belts/door ajar/headlights, and a digital odometer. The OBD-II system was also standard, with a computer port near the driver's-side footwell and a code-checking system via the new digital odometer readout.

In late 1998, Dodge introduced a revised front end for the 1999 model year Sport models with a restyled bumper, quad-beam clear-lens headlamps, and body-color grille. A 6-speed manual transmission was made optional for diesel models in late 2000 for the 2001 model year. A small percentage of the diesel engines for the 1999 and 2000 model years were subject to problems with the water jackets and fuel injectors. The most problematic was the "53" stamped engine block which had a defect that would cause fracturing in the structure of the block itself.

The 2000 models offered the option of heated leather seats. The braking system was upgraded to dual-piston calipers in the front. An Offroad Edition was offered as a package with a 2-inch lift, accomplished with stiffer front springs and rear lift blocks, unique 17x8 wheels, 275/70/17 all-terrain tires, 4.10 rear axle, trussed Dana 44 front axle, limited-slip differential, and skid plates. The Offroad Edition models are also distinguishable with an additional "Offroad" decal on the tailgate under the 4x4 decal. The 2000 model was cut short, ending production in January 2000 to avoid a CAFE requirement. After that, 2001 models began production.

Although Dodge introduced a new Ram 1500 for 2002, the old second-generation style Ram was carried over for the 2002 model year heavy-duty 2500 and 3500 trucks. The new third-generation Ram would not appear in the 2500/3500 variants until 2003. Part of this delay was due to the then-new 5.7 L Hemi engine not being ready for production.

Mexico

Unencumbered by CAFE (Corporate average fuel economy) restrictions, DaimlerChrysler's Mexican subsidiary developed a three-door wagon version of the Ram, called the Ramcharger as was its predecessor. It first appeared in 1998, but was never available in the United States.

There were also medium duty Ram trucks that were manufactured and marketed in Mexico.

Drivetrain

Transmissions
Ram transmissions are labeled such that the first number indicates the number of gears (including overdrive), the second number is the capacity rating, and the last letter is either E for electronic or H for hydraulic.

A500/42RH-RE lower geared light-duty applications found behind the 3.9 L V6. The 42RE + RH are both 4-speed automatic transmissions with identical gear ratios. This transmission came available in 1989 and it is paired with a 10.75-inch diameter torque converter. The RH is a hydraulic governor system that is rated as a medium-duty transmission. The RE is an electronic Hydraulic system that is considered for heavy-duty use. Both transmissions are also used in the Dodge Dakota and Jeep Cherokee among other Chrysler models. Gear ratios in both transmissions are 2.74 to 1 for first gear, 1.54 to 1 for second gear, 1.00 to 1 for third gear, and .69 to 1 for fourth gear.
A518/46RH-RE for more heavy-duty applications found behind the 5.2 L and 5.9 L V8 engines. The 46RH and RE are 4-speed automatics that were born from the A518 family. The A727 was replaced by the A518 family in the early 1990s. The 46RH was the first to replace the A727 and was preceded by the 46RE. The improvement with both models included the overdrive being added. The difference in the two transmissions was the RH had a hydraulically controlled governor versus the computer-controlled one on the RE.
A618/47RH-RE for heavy-duty use behind the V10 gasoline and Cummins diesel engines. The 47RH was used in the 1994 and 1995 model years, while the 47RE was used from 1996 through 2002. The 47RH was released first and was only used in the Ram 2500 and 3500 series trucks. The transmission was able to produce 450 lb-ft of torque and was able to tow trailers up to 19,000 pounds. This transmission was rated to be the highest capacity in the one-ton series of trucks produced by any manufacturer. The RH was a hydraulically operated 3-speed transmission with a hydraulically controlled overdrive gear. The RH was later replaced by the RE however it was by name only since they are both hydraulically controlled.
NV3500 was offered in 1500 Rams and light-duty 2500 Rams.
NV4500 was standard in 2500 and 3500 trucks; the NV4500HD for V10 and diesel models. An NV5600 was offered in 1999 and 2000 Rams and was the only transmission offered behind the High Output diesel in 2001 and 2002.

Transfer cases
There were a total of five transfer cases available for the four-wheel-drive Ram. All are part-time and have a low range of 2.72:1. The 1500 featured an NP231 and NP231HD. The NP241 was standard on V8 2500 Rams. The 2500 and 3500 V10 and diesel featured an NP241DLD from 1993 until 1997. In 1997 the NP241DHD became an option for 2500 Rams and was standard on 3500 Rams from 1998 to 2002.

Axles
The Dodge Ram features a wide variety of axles. For the front axle of 4x4 Rams, a Dana 44 was used on all 1500 Rams and the early (light-duty) 2500 Rams. However, most of the 2500 and all 3500 Rams use Dana 60 front axles. The 1500 Rams and some early light duty 2500 Rams used a 9.25 Chrysler (Spicer) axle in the rear. A Dana 60 rear axle was used on heavy-duty 2500 V8 Rams. A Dana 70 rear axle was used in 2500 Rams with a V10 or a Diesel/Automatic transmission combination. A Dana 80 rear axle was used on 2500 Rams with a manual transmission and V10/diesel engine combination. Every 3500 Ram was made with a Dana 80. The front-drive axles in these Rams were unique in the fact they did not have locking hubs, but featured a center axle disconnect. The 2002 2500 and 3500 Rams saw the eventual phase-out of the center axle disconnect, in favor of front axles that were permanently locked in. Dodge continued to include front axles like this for their 2500, 3500, 4500, and 5500 trucks until the 2013 models.

Engines
A natural-gas-powered engine debuted for the 1995 model year, but was not popular and was only used in fleet vehicles on a limited production run. The Cummins B Series engine was switched from the 12-valve to the 24-valve (ISB) version in the middle of the 1998 model-year Dodge Rams due to emissions regulations. The ISB featured a new computer-controlled electronic injection pump and a 24-valve head design.

Special editions
Limited Edition Indy Pace and SS/T Package - The Dodge Ram Indy Pace Truck was available in 1996. It included longitudinal stripes similar to those on the Dodge Viper along with an optional door sticker stating "Official Truck of the 80th Indianapolis 500". These trucks had a  engine with upgraded exhaust and  more power. These also included  wheels with Goodyear Eagle II 275/60R-17 tires. The SS/T (Super Sport Truck) version was available from 1997 until 1998 and included all the upgrades except the door sticker. The SS/T also had "SS/T" designed into the stripe on both the hood and tailgate. The Indy Trucks were available only in blue with white stripes. The SS/Ts were available in white/blue, red/silver, black/silver, and green/silver. All include a specialty sticker on the inner door stating, "Built with pride in the U.S.A." A real Pace truck is a metal plate on the driver's side frame rail, with a raised number 19 on it. However, the SS/Ts do not have this.
High Output - The Ram trucks started offering a diesel High Output package for 2001 models. 2001/2002 H.O. engines were rated 10 horsepower higher than the standard engine.
Off-Road Edition - The Dodge Ram 1500 SLT Off-Road "Edition" (package) was available in the latter portion of the second generation. It included 17-inch alloy wheels (standard were 16-inch), added 4X4 transfer case skid plate, 4.10 rear axle gear ratio, limited-slip rear differential, heated dual-power side mirrors, fog lamps, and tow hooks in the front-mounted to the frame.

Third generation (2002; DR/DH/D1/DC/DM)

In development from 1996 (styling by Cliff Wilkins finalized in 1998), the third-generation Dodge Ram was unveiled on February 7, 2001, at the 2001 Chicago Auto Show, and debuted for 2002 model year on 1500 models and 2003 on 2500 and 3500 models. This major update included an all-new frame, suspension, powertrains, interiors, and sheet metal. The crew cab models for this generation were actually Quad Cab trucks that had conventional-opening rear doors. The four-wheel-drive light trucks (1500 series) lost their Beam axles in favor of an independent front suspension, but the 2500 and 3500 series retained the live axles for maximum longevity and durability; rear-wheel-drive 2500 & 3500 had class-exclusive rack and pinion steering for their independent front suspension (the 1500 also received rack and pinion steering for the first time). This body style drew heavily from the previous generation.

The redesigned trucks bolstered sales, with 400,000 sold during 2001–2002 and nearly 450,000 sold during 2002–2003, a new high point for the Ram name. At the same time, both Ford and GM trucks were increasing in sales from a 2001 peak of over 850,000 to the 900,000 range. However, with 400,543 Rams sold that year, the total did not keep up with the eleventh-generation F-150 in 2004.

2006 Facelift

The Dodge Ram was updated for the 2006 model year.

For 2006, the steering wheel design was changed to one from the Dodge Dakota and Dodge Durango. Bluetooth U Connect was now available as an option, and a front facelift was given to all Ram models. SIRIUS Satellite Radio was available, as well as a rear seat DVD entertainment system with wireless headphones. The SRT model, with the 8.3 L V10 engine from the Dodge Viper SRT/10, was discontinued after the 2006 model year.

For 2007, Dodge changed the taillights.

Chassis Cab
In 2007, a 3500 Chassis Cab model was introduced with industry-standard rear frame width and wiring to accommodate outfitters. The G56 transmission was the only manual transmission offered.

For 2008, Dodge introduced two more Chassis Cab models, the 4500 and 5500. Both trucks came equipped with the same version of the Cummins  diesel as the 3500 chassis-cab model. Sterling, who worked with Dodge in development, had their own version, called the Sterling Bullet with a unique grille. Sterling is a division of Freightliner Trucks which, like Dodge, was owned by the former DaimlerChrysler. Sterling Trucks was licensed to sell Dodge Ram 4500 series trucks as the Sterling Bullet. When the Sterling brand was phased out by Chrysler Corporation, the Bullet was discontinued.

Engines

Unlike the 5.9 L which was backed by the 4-speed 48RE Transmission, the 6.7 L was equipped with the new 6-speed 68RFE transmission.

2005 was the last year for the first version of the  Hemi V8. 2006 half-ton models offered the Multi-Displacement System Hemi V8 engine that also became available in Chrysler and Dodge sedans. This engine featured the same performance but had a cylinder-deactivating feature enabled under light loads to increase fuel economy by 3 MPG city and 4 MPG hwy.

Axles
For the 2003 model year, AAM axles replaced the Dana Corp axles. In the front, all 2500 and 3500 trucks were 9.25-inch with 33 spline axles. The rear options for the 2500 and 3500 were the AAM Corporate 10.5" and 11.5". Rear-axle shafts are 30 spline. The rear 11.5" has a gear ratio "carrier split" at 3.73 and numerically higher, but the General Motors AAM axles used a different carrier spacing preventing the installation of a Chrysler carrier into some GM axles, but the GM carrier can be installed in the Chrysler axle if a ring gear spacer is installed. Strength is similar to their earlier Dana 70 and 80 counterparts. Direct comparisons are difficult as the axles are made with completely different metallurgy.

Special editions
 HemiSport - The Hemi Sport Edition was the Quad Cab version of the Rumble Bee, and was introduced in 2004. It was available in black, red, or silver, and with either rear-wheel drive or four-wheel drive. It was equipped similarly to the Rumble Bee, but without the number plaque. The HemiSport was discontinued for 2006.
 Dodge Ram VTS Concept - This concept from Dodge was meant to be a design study highly inspired by Viper GTS-inspired bumpers, mirrors, 17-inch wheels, Blue Paint, dual white stripes and Viper GTS sourced 415 bhp V10. VTS was vital in the development of 500 bhp Ram SRT-10 that were built from 2004 until 2006.
 Dodge Ram SRT-10 - This is a regular or quad-cab body with the Dodge Viper's V10 engine 8.3 L, 22" wheels and Pirelli tires, lowered suspension, bucket seats, body modifications, and a spoiler. The 2004 version was available only in a single cab with a 6-speed manual transmission and a Hurst shifter. For 2005, Dodge released a Quad Cab version of the Viper-V10-powered truck with a modified 48RE four-speed automatic transmission from the Ram with the Cummins turbodiesel engine. In 2004, the truck held the Guinness World Record for "World's Fastest Production Pickup Truck" with a speed of 154.587 mph (247.3 km/h). This record stood until overtaken by the Australian HSV Maloo R8, a sport utility coupe, in May 2006. SRT-10 production ended on June 30, 2006.
 Power Wagon - This model, introduced for 2005, is an off-road-focused version of the Ram. The name is drawn from Dodge's line of 4-wheel-drive trucks made from the early 1940s through the 1980s. It comes with the  Hemi engine, (changed to the 6.4 L Hemi model year 2014 to present) electronic locking differentials, electronic disconnecting front sway bar, 285/70R17 off-road tires mounted on power wagon specific 17" wheels with dual safety beads, factory lift springs with power wagon specific spring rates, fender flares, full underbody skid plates, "Power Wagon" nameplates instead of the standard Ram badging, and a 12,000-pound winch. This truck was built on the 2500 platform.

 Rumble Bee - The Rumble Bee package is a limited sport-truck version of the Ram. It was available only on regular-cab/short-box pickups; however, some other versions of the Ram were modified to look like Rumble Bees. It includes lower body cladding, 20" wheels, a hood scoop, and an SLT interior specially trimmed with yellow dashboard and door panel inserts and a serialized number plate. On the rear of the box is a stripe with a "Rumble Bee" emblem, similar to that of the Super Bee. All Rumble Bees are either black with "solar yellow" trim or yellow with black trim. 4,858 were produced in 2004, and 5,174 in 2005.
 HemiGTX - The Hemi GTX package is a limited sport-truck version of the Ram. Introduced in 2004 and only made in 2004 and 2005, these were customized by LA West of Indiana as ordered from dealers, adding an additional $8,300.50 in the sticker price. It was available on regular-cab/short-box and quad-cab/short-box pickups and include a custom overall paint from Mopar's Impact colors from the 1970s (this includes Hemi Orange, Plum Crazy Purple, Sublime Green, and Banana Yellow). 20" American Racing Motto chrome wheels, a new cowl "blacked-out" hood, and a specially trimmed leather 2-tone interior including a serialized number plate on the driver's-side doorjamb were offered. On the sides is a "hockey-stick" stripe with "HEMI GTX" that extended from the hood to the rear of the box. The airbox was also painted to match the body color, and a color-matched steering wheel was added as well. There were only 433 produced in 2004 and roughly the same number in 2005. A certificate of authenticity was given to all original owners.

 Daytona - Introduced for 2005, the Ram Daytona was a new sport-truck edition of the Ram. It was available as a 5.7-liter Hemi V8 in Regular or Quad-Cab styles and featured lower-body cladding, 20-inch chrome wheels, SRT-10 hood, Borla dual exhaust, serialized number plate, and a tall rear spoiler reminiscent of the 1969 Dodge Charger Daytona. The Daytonas had a black body stripe to match the rear spoiler and came in silver or "Go Mango" paint (a metallic orange color reminiscent of the Dodge's "high impact" colors from the 1960s and 1970s) with matching interior trim. The Dodge Ram Daytona had a 3.92 ratio rear end, the same rear end as the Dodge Ram Rumble Bee. Several exterior items were unique to the Daytona package (such as the gas door and dual side-exit exhaust tips) which made it different from other equipment packages. It was equipped with  chrome wheels and performance tires. Replacing the standard hood is one with a non-functional hood scoop. The most noticeable feature is the large spoiler which is attached at the rear of the cargo box. The  spoiler lined up with the flat black stripe that ran along the back of the bed side with the word 'Daytona' written in the middle. This spoiler is reminiscent of the 1969 Dodge Charger Daytona.
Contractor's Special hybrid - Dodge announced a hybrid version of the Ram, dubbed the Contractor's Special, in 2003. However, the schedule for delivery slipped as Dodge backed away from the vehicle. The hybrid Ram was available only for fleet purchasers (if at all) and did not enter mass production. It offered an AC electrical outlet panel for running an entire job site worth of power tools, but the through-the-road method of balancing the gas engine and electric motor reportedly did not work as desired. Dodge has announced that it would use a hybrid transmission developed jointly with General Motors and BMW.
NightRunner - 400 of these were assembled from January 2006 to December 2006 (200 Single-cab and 200 Quad-cab). The Limited Edition NightRunner trim includes Brilliant Black Paint, 22-inch (510 mm) black chrome wheels, black chrome grille, the 8.3 L Viper engine, dark shaded headlamps, NightRunner graphics on the sides of the rear bed, Piano black dash, and a numbered plate below the climate controls.

Fourth generation (2009; DS/DJ/D2)

The fourth generation Dodge Ram was introduced at the 2008 North American International Auto Show in Detroit. This latest generation was sold as the 2009 Dodge Ram 1500 starting in Fall 2008. The 2500, 3500, 4500 and 5500 models were later added to the lineup. In 2010, the Ram Trucks brand was separated from Dodge starting with the 2011 model year.

Chrysler LLC attempted to keep the Ram competitive in the market through various developments for the 2009 model, including a new four-door cab style offering, new suspension, a new hemi engine option, and the Rambox, a new storage system that allows secure storage inside the truck's bed walls. Later models have the Rambox system tied in with the remote keyless system.

In 2010, Ram was separated from Dodge, and made a separate marque. This was supposedly done so Dodge could focus more on passenger and performance cars. Despite splitting from Dodge in 2010, it was still marketed as one until the 2013 refresh.

Since 2011, Ram 2500/3500 models were marketed as having a "class-exclusive" manual transmission option, as General Motors and Ford discontinued manual transmissions for North American models in 2006 and 2010 respectively. The manual transmission was available until the end of this generation's production in 2018.

Ram 1500 (DS) is assembled at Warren Truck Assembly in Warren, Michigan. Ram 1500 Single Cab, Ram Mega Cab, Ram 2500/3500, DX Chassis Cab (Mexico Market), Ram 4500/5500 are assembled at Saltillo Truck Assembly Plant in Coahuila, Mexico.

Cab options

The Mega Cab option was deleted on the 1500 model, replaced by a true four-door crew cab. Other cab options are regular cab and Quad Cab. The Mega Cab option remains on the heavy-duty models, along with crew cab. Improvements made from the previous generation mean the rear seats are now able to recline.

Handling
A coil spring five-link rear suspension replaces the leaf springs for the 1500.

Payload capacities

Heavy Duty Chassis Cabs 

Chassis Cab versions were made for the Ram 3500, 4500, and 5500 models. The 3500 Heavy Duty model was unveiled at the 2009 Chicago Auto Show.

Transmission choices included a standard 6-speed manual or optional 6-speed Aisin automatic. Both transmissions support the Power Takeoff option.

The 3500 model has regular or crew cab, single-rear-wheel or dual-rear-wheel. Four cab-axle lengths (60, 84, 108 and 120 inches) for 4500/5500 or two cab-axle lengths (60 and 84 inches) for 3500, and three trim levels (ST, SLT and Laramie).

The Ram 3500 has three axle ratios (3.42, 3.73, and 4.10) and 17-inch wheels. Ram 4500/5500 has three axle ratios (4.10, 4.44, and 4.88) and 19.5-inch wheels. The 4500/5500 Rams rear axle is a Dana S 110. The front axle on 4x4 models is manufactured by Magna, while 2-wheel-drive models just have a solid, non-drive axle.

Concept truck
The Ram concept truck "Long Hauler" from 2012 is based mostly on existing Ram truck parts. The powertrain, frame, and wheels are all components of the Ram 5500 Chassis Cab. It is a "Mega Cab" optional on the lighter Rams. The GCWR for this truck is 37,500 lb and the weight of the truck is 9,300 lb.

Model year changes

2013 changes
The 1500 gets a minor restyling. It features a new front fascia, optional projector-beam halogen headlamps with LED turn signals/parking lamps, wheels, and interior, where the "DODGE" name was removed from the dashboard and replaced with "RAM".

All models offered for 2012 continue to be available for 2013 with the addition of a new high-end trim, the Laramie Longhorn Limited. (Tradesman, Express, SLT, Big Horn, Lone Star, Sport, R/T, Laramie, and Laramie Longhorn). The Rambox cargo management system continues to be available on most models for 2013. For 2013, the base ST model becomes the Tradesman model.

2013 models have revised engine and transmission options. New to the lineup is Chrysler's corporate 3.6 L Pentastar V6, coupled to the new ZF 8-speed Torqueflite8 Automatic. The Pentastar/ZF 8-speed is optional. It is still available with the 65RFE 6-speed Automatic, with the new 8-speed Torqueflite8 Automatic optional.

Air suspension is optional for 2013 models, offering four ride height settings. Electronic stability control becomes standard on 2500 and 3500 models. For 2013, the Ram is also the first North American pickup truck to offer keyless ignition.

New infotainment systems are available for the RAM 1500 for 2013:

The base Uconnect 3.0 (RA1) radio includes an AM/FM radio, Radio Data System (RDS), a monochrome LCD display screen, a 3.5-millimeter auxiliary audio input jack, and a single USB port for charging purposes only.

The "up-level" Uconnect 5.0BT (RA2) radio adds a full-color, 5.0-inch color touch-screen display, voice control for the phone, a micro SD card slot, Bluetooth for the phone, and A2DP wireless stereo audio streaming capabilities, and vehicle customization options on-screen.

The "top-of-the-line" radios are the Uconnect ACCESS 8.4A (RA3) and Uconnect ACCESS 8.4AN (RA4). These radios add a full-color, 8.4-inch color touch-screen display, full voice control, SiriusXM satellite radio, the Uconnect ACCESS System, featuring roadside assistance and 9-1-1 emergency call buttons on the rear-view mirror, mobile app compatibility, remote USB ports for the integration of compatible devices, enhanced in-vehicle customization options, automatic notification of airbag deployment, concierge services, remote control via an app installed on a compatible smartphone, and the ability to add GPS navigation from Garmin for vehicles not equipped with the option from the factory (it is activated by a dealership for a fee, however, does not include SiriusXM Travel Link or 3D mapping). The Uconnect ACCESS 8.4AN (RA4) adds GPS navigation from Garmin, HD Radio SiriusXM Travel Link, 3D mapping, and enhanced mobile app compatibility. The system also includes a built-in 3G internet router, allowing for wireless connection to the internet while the vehicle is parked with a monthly service subscription. The system can also be updated to add additional features that will be available in the future via a USB stick inserted into one of the remote USB ports. Remote steering wheel-mounted controls are also included with this system.

Options such as a CD Player (mounted in the center console of the vehicle), SiriusXM satellite radio and a Rearview Backup Camera can be added to any radio.

3500
The 2013 models move up to an 18-inch standard wheel, with 18-inch forged Alcoa wheels as an option. 3500 models offer a High Output package for the diesel. The rear differential ring gear is increased from 11.5-inches to 11.8-inches on H.O. trucks. The 11.8 axle cover doubles as a heat sink.

4x4
Ram installed the Center axle disconnect into the 3500 4x4 models. 2500 Ram trucks did not have a CAD system until the 2014 models. Ram states this technology improves fuel efficiency by 1 MPG, although EPA tests do not include class 2 and class 3 trucks in the MPG/fuel efficiency tests. The 4x4 saw additional changes with the transfer case now being made by BorgWarner instead of New Venture Gear.

High Fuel Efficiency
A new model offered for the 2013 Ram is the HFE (High Fuel Efficiency). Based on the SLT model, the HFE offers 18/25 MPG out of its Pentastar V6 engine and eight-speed TorqueFlite transmission. It is available only on the two-wheel-drive regular cab model with a 6.33-foot bed. Standard features include a 220-amp alternator and an 800-amp battery to assist with the start-stop system. 3.21:1 axle gearing is also standard.

2014 changes

The option of air suspension became available on the rear of the 2014 model year 2500 and 3500 pick-up trucks. 1500 models added the option of an Eco-Diesel V6. 2500 models now feature coil spring suspension, instead of leaf spring. The cast iron, flex-fuel, 4.7 V8 Chrysler PowerTech engine was discontinued, ending Corsair engine production, leaving the Ram 1500 with two engine choices. The aluminum, flex-fuel 3.6 V6 Pentastar is now the base engine, along with the 8-speed Torque-Flite transmission. The 3.6 L Pentastar V6 was available on Laramie and Longhorn trims. The Ram heavy-duty series of trucks (2500, 3500, 4500, and 5500) received a new interior design and revised exterior styling from the Ram 1500, which was restyled in 2013. Also for 2014, the new Outdoorsman trim became available, particularly intended for buyers who hunt, fish, and camp. The Mossy Oak special edition (first available in 2012) also returned for 2014.

2016 changes

For 2016, the all-new Ram 1500 Rebel debuted, offering off-road suspension with a  higher ride height, larger tires, and a unique interior to add to the Ram 1500 Big Horn and Lone Star trim levels. It features a unique blacked-out grille with powder coated front bumper and exclusive aluminum hood, skid plates, and tow hooks. Four-wheel drive is available with either powertrain, but the two-wheel drive model is V8-only. The sole body configuration offered is a crew cab with a short pickup bed.

SLT models of all Ram trucks now receive the U Connect 5.0BT (RA2) touch-screen radio as standard equipment, adding steering wheel-mounted remote phone controls, Bluetooth hands-free calling and wireless audio streaming, SiriusXM Satellite Radio, a USB port, and 3.5 mm auxiliary input jack, Radio Data System (RDS), voice control, in-radio vehicle customization, and a full-color five-inch LCD touch-screen display. This was previously a $495.00 option on the Ram SLT.

2017 changes
For 2017, the Ram 1500 Laramie Longhorn and Limited trims received the new RAM front grille and "RAM" emblem across the rear tailgate that debuted on the 2016 RAM 1500 Rebel.

In mid-2017, the RAM 1500's 3.0 L EcoDiesel V6 turbodiesel engine, produced by VM Motori, was dropped in mid-2017 in response to emissions cheating allegations. The engine was re-introduced in early 2018, as re-certification by the EPA has been obtained.

The 1500 SLT model loses the U Connect ACCESS 8.4 infotainment system (RA3) option, leaving the U Connect 5.0BT (RA2) radio as the only radio option. However. all Ram heavy-duty (2500, 3500, 4500, and 5500) SLT models still offered the U Connect ACCESS 8.4 infotainment system (RA3) as an option.

The Rebel trim level of the Ram 1500 gains the previously optional U Connect ACCESS 8.4A infotainment system as standard equipment, as do the Big Horn and Lone Star trim levels. A Rebel Black Edition Package is available that adds black accents to the Rebel.

The Laramie trim level of the Ram 1500, 2500, 3500, 4500, and 5500 gets a standard nine-speaker, 506-watt Alpine 7.1-channel surround-sound premium audio system as standard equipment.

Three new special edition trim levels debut for 2017 for the Ram 1500 model:

 The Lone Star Silver Edition, available exclusively at Ram dealerships in Texas and based on the Texas-only Lone Star trim level, adds additional chrome trim pieces to the trim level. It debuted at the 2016 Texas State Fair.
 The Lone Star Yellow Rose Edition, also available exclusively at Ram dealerships in Texas and also based on the Texas-only Lone Star trim level, is available only in a model-exclusive Stinger Yellow Clear Coat exterior paint color. It debuted at the 2016 Texas State Fair.
 The Night Edition, available at Ram dealerships nationwide, is based on the Sport trim level and adds black-finished emblems, twenty-inch aluminum-alloy wheels, front grille, door handles, and emblems.

There is also a new Off-Road Package available for all Ram 2500 models (aside from the Power Wagon trim level, which includes the package as standard equipment), and includes unique pickup bedside graphics, off-road suspension, front tow hooks, and the protection package.

The mid-level SLT trim level of the RAM 1500 is no longer available to retail customers, as it is now a lesser-equipped model reserved exclusively for fleet customers. However, the SLT trim level still remains for the Ram 2500, 3500, 4500, and 5500 models, and is available to retail customers. However, retail customers wanting SLT features such as chrome front and rear bumpers and front grille, seventeen-inch aluminum-alloy wheels, power windows and door locks with keyless entry, the U Connect 5.0BT (RA2) touch-screen radio, cloth seating surfaces, SiriusXM Satellite Radio, a rear-view backup camera system, and floor carpeting, can still opt for the Chrome Appearance and Popular Equipment Packages on the Tradesman model.

A less expensive Bluetooth option for the Ram truck is a new U Connect 3.0BT (RA2) radio that includes an AM/FM radio and SiriusXM Satellite Radio tuner, Radio Data System (RDS), U Connect Bluetooth hands-free phone system with audio streaming and voice command, steering wheel-mounted remote voice command controls, a USB port, and 3.5 mm auxiliary audio input jack, and a three-inch (3.0") monochrome LCD display screen. This radio option is available for the Tradesman trim level of all Ram trucks, and the Express trim level of the Ram 1500, and is included as part of a Popular Equipment Package on the latter model. Previously, customers wanting Bluetooth on a Ram Tradesman or Ram 1500 Express would have to upgrade to the U Connect 5.0BT (RA2) touch-screen radio, which would add the same features as described above, as well as onscreen vehicle customization via the radio, and a full five-inch (5.0") color touch-screen display, and cost an additional $495.00. In order to do this, the customer would also have to select the Popular Equipment Package on both models.

The RAM 2500 Power Wagon returned with a 6.4 L HEMI gasoline V8 engine, a unique graphics package (delete option), black front grille, door handles, larger tires, and black aluminum-alloy wheels as well as the Off-Road Package. The Power Wagon Package is also available for the Ram 2500 Tradesman trim level, and also adds the 6.4 L HEMI gasoline V8 engine.

2018 changes
Changes to the Ram for 2018 included the addition of HD Radio to all U Connect 8.4 infotainment systems, as well as a new 4G LTE wireless hot-spot provided by AT&T Wireless, an AT&T Wireless 4G LTE in-vehicle modem (both the AT&T Wireless 4G LTE modem and 4G LTE mobile hot-spot replace the Sprint 3G CDMA modem and 3G CDMA mobile hot-spot offered on previous Ram models), Apple CarPlay and Android Auto smartphone integration for the U Connect 8.4 infotainment systems, and the SiriusXM Guardian service replacing the U Connect ACCESS service offered on previous RAM models for the U Connect 8.4 infotainment systems. In addition, all U Connect 8.4 infotainment systems get a new user interface design for easier navigation of menus and applications.

The VM Motori-produced 3.0 L EcoDiesel V6 turbodiesel engine returned in early 2018 for the RAM 1500, as it has been re-certified by the EPA after allegations of emissions cheating in 2017.

Most upper trim levels of the RAM 1500 (Sport, Rebel, Laramie Longhorn, and Limited) get the new RAM front grille introduced for 2016, as well as a large 'RAM' emblem on the rear tailgate. Lower to mid-trim levels of the RAM 1500 (Tradesman, Express, Big Horn, Lone Star, and Laramie) retain the standard RAM "Cross-Hair" front grille.

The Night Edition and Lone Star Silver Edition trim levels were continued.

For 2018, there are two new special editions:
 The Harvest Edition (also available on the Ram 2500 and 3500), are based on the Big Horn and Lone Star models. Available in only four paint colors, two of which are unique to the Harvest Edition (Case IH Red, New Holland Blue, two-tone Black Clear Coat and Bright Silver Metallic, or Bright White Clear Coat). Aimed at farmers, the Harvest Edition adds features that are otherwise optional on the Big Horn and Lone Star, such as seventeen-inch chrome-clad aluminum-alloy wheels with all-terrain tires on 4X4 models, the U Connect 8.4 infotainment system with GPS navigation, SiriusXM Travel Link with five years of service included and one year of SiriusXM Guardian service, a trailer tow package with integrated trailer brake control, rear-mounted tow hitch, and trailer tow side mirrors. Also included are front bucket seats with power front driver's seat trimmed in premium cloth, chrome side steps, chrome side mirror covers, chrome door handles, and chrome front tow hooks. It is available as either a Quad Cab or a Crew Cab.
 The Laramie Longhorn Southfork Edition Package, available on 1500, 2500, and 3500 Laramie Longhorn models, adds even more luxury features to the already luxurious truck, such as unique twenty-inch polished aluminum-alloy wheels, unique real wood interior trim, and a unique two-tone brown-and-beige interior color scheme.

2019 changes

For 2019, the current fourth-generation Ram 1500 continued to be produced alongside its successor, the fifth-generation Ram 1500. Virtually identical to 2018 models, 2019 trucks were given a new name, Ram 1500 Classic, to distinguish them from their all-new fifth-generation successors. The Ram 1500 Classic is offered as a 2-door Regular Cab model, which the fifth-generation Ram 1500 does not. In addition, Quad and Crew Cab models are also offered.

In addition, the current-generation Ram 2500, Ram 3500, and Ram 3500/4500/5500 Chassis Cab models were redesigned for the 2019 model year. In addition to a totally new front clip, the 2019 Ram 2500 and 3500 received new frames and updated interiors that borrowed heavily from the new DT 1500 interior. The Hemi 5.7L engine is dropped (except in Mexico-market Ram 4000), and the Hemi 6.4L becomes the base engine. For 2500 and 3500 pickups with the 6.4L, a ZF 8HP75-LCV 8-speed automatic is mated. The 6.7-liter Cummins turbo-diesel returns in both Standard and High-Output form, but with a new compacted-graphite iron (CGI) block. Only automatic transmissions are available (except on Mexico-market Ram 4000).

2020 changes
Tradesman, Express, SLT (fleet only), Warlock, Big Horn, and Laramie trims are available. A Black Appearance Package becomes available for the Warlock trim, which adds twenty-inch black-finished aluminum-alloy wheels, and other black accents to the exterior of the truck.

2021 changes
For 2021, the Ram 1500 Classic Warlock trim receives an Off-Road Package, which includes all-terrain tires, as well as unique aluminum-alloy wheels. Base Tradesman and Express trims receive a newly available Infotainment Package, which includes the U Connect 4C 8.4-inch touchscreen infotainment system, SiriusXM Satellite Radio, HD Radio, and Apple CarPlay and Android Auto smartphone integration. The base U Connect 3.0 and U Connect 3.0BT radios are discontinued, as the U Connect 3 5.0BT touchscreen radio becomes standard equipment on all models, also adding the U Connect Bluetooth hands-free phone system with audio streaming and steering wheel-mounted phone controls as standard equipment on all models.

2022 changes
For 2022, all Ram 1500 Classic models receive an optional upgraded U Connect 5 8.4-inch touchscreen infotainment system, which now includes wired and wireless Apple CarPlay and Android Auto smartphone integration, as well as a new Android operating system. The older U Connect 4C GPS navigation radio, as well as the U Connect 3 5.0BT touchscreen radio, both remain available.

2023 changes
The 2023 Ram 1500 Classic's regular cab will be offered in the United States exclusively with a long bed. The quad cab remains available as well.

Engines

Plug-in hybrid
A two-mode hybrid version was planned to begin production in 2010, but Chrysler decided to cancel it in favor of a smaller test fleet of 140 plug-in hybrid (PHEV) Rams developed with support from a  million grant from the U.S. Department of Energy financed through the American Recovery and Reinvestment Act of 2009. The Chrysler PHEV pickup project has an estimated total cost of  million. The RAM 1500 pickup PHEV was introduced at the January 2011 Washington Auto Show. The vehicle is part of a three-year demonstration program intended to field test and evaluate battery performance across a wide range of drive cycles and temperature ambients, and also to evaluate customer acceptance. The PHEV demonstrator pick-up trucks are assembled at the Warren Truck Assembly plant in Michigan and the plug-in hybrid conversion takes place at the Chrysler Technology Center in Auburn Hills, Michigan. The demonstrators are being allocated for field testing among local and state governments, utility companies, and a US Army base. Chrysler has no plans for a production version.

The Ram 1500 PHEV demonstrator has a 345 hp 5.7 L Hemi V8 gasoline engine mated to a two-mode hybrid transmission and a 12.9 kWh 355V lithium-ion battery from Electrovaya. The fully charged plug-in starts off with charge depletion with limited regeneration at the high end of the state of charge (SoC). That ramps up to a full regenerative capability somewhere in the 70 to 95% range and depletes down to about 20%. Once depleted, it comes into a narrow charge-sustaining range. The plug-in pick-up meets AT-PZEV emissions standards, making it the only full-size V8 pickup with an AT-PZEV rating.

The first 20 Ram PHEV demonstrators were delivered in May 2011 to Clark County, Nevada and Yuma, Arizona, with 10 units each city. Other cities that received the demonstration PHEVs are San Francisco and Sacramento, California, Albany, New York, and Charlotte, North Carolina. In September 2011, another 10 units were delivered to the Massachusetts Bay Transportation Authority (MBTA). Another 5 units were delivered to Central Hudson Gas & Electric and National Grid. DTE Energy in Detroit is scheduled to receive 10 Ram PHEVs.

Special editions
Dodge Ram R/T - A concept truck with a blue body, 22-inch forged wheels, SRT stripes, and a new front bumper with chin spoiler. It was unveiled in 2008 at the SEMA Show. Production of the Dodge Ram R/T began for the 2009 model year. It is a regular cab, short bed, 2WD 1500 Ram with 22" wheels, a 4.10 final drive gear ratio (the only way to get a 4.10 rear in a 1500), an R/T badge in the lower-right corner of the grille, and a Hemi. It also has the performance hood from the Sport Appearance Package on other Ram Sport models, but does not have the striping package that the concept had.
The engine comes from the Dodge Challenger SRT8 which is paired with a 5-speed automatic W5A580 transmission or a 6-speed manual Tremec TR6060 transmission. The concept features a regular cab painted in dark blue clear coat with an off-center light blue stripe. It sits on 22-inch wheels painted hyperblack. 
2015 Ram Rebel - The Ram Rebel is the Ram 1500's off-road trim. It is available with the 5.7 L Hemi and 3.6 L Pentastar. The Rebel was available in the third quarter of 2015.
2019 Ram Warlock - The Ram 1500 Classic Warlock is making a comeback from the 1970s, Dodge Warlock was the first in 1976 (production ceased in 1979). It is available with the 5.7 L Hemi and 3.6 L Pentastar. The Warlock was available in the first quarter of 2019.

Issues

Fire incident, Hybrid, 2012

In September 2012, Chrysler temporarily suspended the demonstration program. All 109 Ram 1500 Plug-in Hybrids and 23 Chrysler Town & Country plug-in hybrids deployed by the program were recalled due to damage sustained by three separate pickup trucks when their 12.9 kWh battery packs overheated. The carmaker plans to upgrade the battery packs with cells that use a different lithium-ion chemistry before the vehicles go back into service. Chrysler explained that no one was injured from any of the incidents, and the vehicles were not occupied at the time, nor any of the minivans were involved in any incident, but they were withdrawn as a precaution. The demonstration is a program jointly funded by Chrysler and the U.S. Department of Energy that includes the first-ever factory-produced vehicles capable of reverse power flow. The experimental system would allow fleet operators to use their plug-in hybrids to supply electricity for a building during a power outage, reduce power usage when electric rates are high or even sell electricity back to their utility company. The company reported that the demonstration fleet had collectively accumulated 1.3 million miles (2.1 million km) before the vehicles were recalled.

Remote Control, Software, Uconnect Entertainment System, 2015
Charlie Miller, security researcher for Twitter and former NSA hacker, and Chris Valasek, director of vehicle security research at the consultancy IOActive, showed how a Jeep Cherokee can be remote controlled. FCA recalled 1.4 million vehicles with the Uconnect entertainment system on board.

Safety
The Ram comes standard with four-wheel anti-lock disc brakes, side curtain airbags, and an electronic stability program or ESP. In Insurance Institute for Highway Safety (IIHS) crash tests, the 2009 Ram received a Good overall score in the frontal crash test, and a Marginal score in the side impact test, as well as the roof strength test.

1 strength-to-weight ratio: 2.97

2 strength-to-weight ratio: 3.17

It received a 5-star frontal crash test rating from the NHTSA, however under later testing methods it received an overall 3-star rating. In the side-pole test it was given a single star rating, because of excessive forces to the thoracic region. While the Ram 1500 features standard side-curtain airbags it does not include side torso airbags. The vehicle was redesigned and retested, and received a 5-star rating.

Gallery

Fifth generation (2019) 

The fifth-generation Ram made its debut at the 2018 North American International Auto Show in Detroit, Michigan, on January 15, 2018 while its HD version made its debut at the same show on January 14, 2019.

2019 Ram 1500 sales began the first quarter of 2018 as an early 2019 model year vehicle. The 2019 Ram 1500 pickup truck offered just seven trim levels, compared to the previous 11 different trim levels.

Also introduced in 2019 was the new U-Connect platform sporting a 12-inch touchscreen display, the largest in its class.

This pairs with a total weight reduction of about  compared to the previous generation.

2021 changes 
The 2021 year received a Trailer Reverse Steering Control option as a part of the Trailer-Tow package. The 2021 Ram 1500 also received a Snow Plow Prep Package option.

Concept vehicles

Revolution
The Ram Revolution is Ram's first all-electric concept pickup truck. Featured for the 2024 model year, the Revolution is a body-on-frame design, with two motors providing all-wheel drive. As of January 2023, Ram has not provided any motor specifications other than stating that 100 miles of charge can be achieved within 10 minutes at a Level 3 DC fast-charging station.

World markets
In 2022, Ram trucks were available in the United States, Canada, Mexico, Brazil, Colombia, Argentina, Chile, Paraguay, Angola, Ghana, Peru, Europe, the Philippines and the Middle East. The Ram trucks officially sold in many Latin American countries are outfitted with UNECE WP.29 lighting equipments, including the taillights with separate amber turn signal indicators.

No right-hand-drive version has been built for the Australia, New Zealand, United Kingdom, South Africa, and other countries where the rule of the road is on the left. In 2016, FCA via the Ateco (ASV) group commenced selling the Ram 2500 and 3500 in Australia and New Zealand and the Ram 1500 in 2018. These are converted to right-hand drive in Australia before the sale. Pricing commences from $80,000AUD (approx US$54,000 as of 28/08/19) for the 1500.

Ram trucks are provided for the European market in cooperation with FCA by AEC Europe in Germany and the Swiss company AutoGlobal Trade. Germany and Scandinavian countries are some of the largest European markets for the Ram. A thriving gray market exists in Australia, New Zealand, and the United Kingdom that has imported and converted Ram trucks to right-hand-drive and to meet the local regulations, being more common in Australia since LHD cars less than 30 years old (or 15 years old if registered in Western Australia) cannot be legally driven on Australian public roads unless they are granted a diplomatic or a research and development exception to the rule. In the United Kingdom and Japan, there is no such restriction, so a stock LHD Ram (or any other LHD vehicle) is not required to undergo the costly and time-consuming process of an RHD conversion in order to be compliant with EU regulations.

Gray import gallery

Nissan Titan
Following the collapse of Nissan Titan sales in 2008, there were talks that the next generation of Nissan's full-sized pickup would be outsourced to Chrysler as a version of the Ram 1500. Nissan had been planning to phase out Titan production in its Canton, Mississippi factory in 2010 with the new Nissan-only design for a cab, body and interior riding on the Dodge Ram chassis assembled in Chrysler's truck assembly lines in Saltillo, Mexico. However, the deal to build Nissan Titan pickups off the full-sized Dodge Ram pickup starting in 2011 was delayed with the changes at Chrysler and Fiat. Nissan eventually decided to keep the Titan, and went on to release the second generation Titan as a 2016 model.

Special editions

Express - The Express is a Dodge Ram 1500 that offered special badges, 20" tires and wheels from the Dodge Ram 1500 SLT, cloth seating surfaces, and a 5.7L HEMI V8 engine.
2012 Detroit Red Wings Edition - The Detroit Red Wings Edition is a Crew Cab model with 4x4, special Red Wings seats and "Detroit Red Wings Edition" decals (on both sides of the box and on the lower left of the tailgate). It is available in red, white and black. 1,593 were built in two different editions. (Edition No. 1 - 1,283 and Edition No. 2 - 310)

Motorsport

The Ram Pickup represented both the Dodge and Ram brands in the NASCAR Camping World Truck Series from 1995 to 2016, having won the Manufacturer's Championship in 2001, 2003, and 2004.

The Ram Pickup also won the San Felipe 250 in 2008 and 2009.

Sales

Notes

References

External links

 
 Addition Information of the Dodge Ram
 More information about the Dodge Ram

Ram Trucks
Ram
Flexible-fuel vehicles
Pickup trucks
All-wheel-drive vehicles
Rear-wheel-drive vehicles
1990s cars
Hybrid trucks
2000s cars
2010s cars
Cars introduced in 1980